Demitri Hayidakis (6 September 1916 – 25 August 2000) was a South African cricketer. He played in ten first-class matches for Border from 1936/37 to 1947/48.

See also
 List of Border representative cricketers

References

External links
 

1916 births
2000 deaths
South African cricketers
Border cricketers
Cricketers from East London, Eastern Cape